Sainte Foy or Sainte Foi (French, 'Saint Faith' or 'holy faith') may refer to:

Places

France
Sainte-Foi, in the Ariège département
Sainte-Foy, Landes, in the Landes département 
Sainte-Foy, Saône-et-Loire, in the Saône-et-Loire  département 
Sainte-Foy, Seine-Maritime, in the Seine-Maritime  département 
Sainte-Foy, Vendée, in the Vendée  département
Sainte-Foy-d'Aigrefeuille, in the Haute-Garonne  département 
Sainte-Foy-de-Belvès, in the Dordogne  département 
Sainte-Foy-de-Longas, in the Dordogne  département 
Sainte-Foy-de-Montgommery, in the Calvados  département 
Sainte-Foy-de-Peyrolières, in the Haute-Garonne  département 
Sainte-Foy-la-Grande, in the Gironde  département 
Sainte-Foy-la-Longue, in the Gironde  département 
Sainte-Foy-l'Argentière, in the Rhône  département 
Sainte-Foy-lès-Lyon, in the Rhône  département 
Sainte-Foy-Saint-Sulpice, in the Loire  département 
Sainte-Foy-Tarentaise, in the Savoie  département
Abbey Church of Sainte-Foy, in Conques, Aveyron département

North America
Sainte-Foy, Quebec City, Canada
Sainte-Foy station

People
Charles-Louis Sainte-Foy (1817–1877), French opera singer
Saint Faith, 3rd-century French saint, Sainte-Foy in French

See also

 Santa Fe (disambiguation)